George Leslie Norris  (21 May 1921 – 6 April 2006), was a prize-winning Welsh poet and short story writer. He taught at academic institutions in Britain and the United States, including Brigham Young University. Norris is considered one of the most important Welsh writers of the post-war period, and his literary publications have won many prizes.

Early life
George Leslie Norris was born on 21 May 1921 in Merthyr Tydfil, South Wales. His parents were George and Mary Jane Norris. Leslie had two younger brothers, Eric and Gordon. His father George worked as a miner, but after First World War became a milkman because of his declining health. Leslie grew up in Wales during the Great Depression. He enjoyed reading books and playing sports as a kid. He attended Georgetown Primary School from 1926 to 1931. He attended Cyfarthfa Castle Grammar School after that. Throughout school, Norris was involved in sports like football and boxing. By age 12, Leslie knew he wanted to be a poet and he went to listen to acclaimed poets like Dylan Thomas and Vernon Watkins. He published his first poem in 1938 at the age of seventeen. That same year, Norris had to drop out of school due to financial pressures. He began working as a rates clerk in the Town Hall in Merthyr.

When he was nineteen years old he joined the Royal Air Force during the Second World War. In May 1940 he trained as a pilot. He got blood poisoning, however, from steel ropes, and was discharged in June 1941. His father died the next year of cancer. Norris returned to his work at the town hall. He became a soccer referee and was part of the Merthyr Referees Society.

Leslie married Catherine (Kitty) Morgan in July 1948, and they remained together the rest of his life. While publicly the couple maintained that they had no children, Norris confided to close friends that they had one child who died in infancy. Kitty was a chemist, and Norris was her second husband. Shortly after their marriage, Leslie was accepted at the City of Coventry Teacher Training College.

Teaching career
After Leslie's graduation, he taught at the Grass Royal School in Yeovil, Somerset. In 1952, he transferred to Southdown Junior School in Bath, Somerset. He later became headmaster of Westergate School in West Sussex. He obtained a master's degree in philosophy from the University of Southampton in 1958. He secured a job as a lecturer in 1958 at Bognor Regis College of Education and later taught at the West Sussex Institute of Higher Learning. There, his wife taught as well until 1966. Leslie was a principal lecturer at the West Sussex Institute from 1956 to 1974.

Leslie became a visiting professor at the University of Washington in 1973. He was so impacted by his experience teaching in America that he returned to England only to resign his principal lectureship at Bognor Regis. Leslie was Residential Poet at Eton in 1977.  In 1976, he and his wife visited New England. From 1980–1982 he visited to Seattle, Washington and East Carolina University.

In 1983 Norris was invited to teach for six months at Brigham Young University (BYU) in Provo, Utah, United States of America. He settled with his wife, Catherine Morgan, and remained there until his death. He was appointed the official Poet-in-Residence at the university. Leslie was made a Professor of Creative Writing. His wife also taught at BYU.  Some of his documents, personal materials and letters are in the L. Tom Perry Special Collections at the Harold B. Lee Library at BYU.

Literary work 
Norris published his first poem in 1938 and by 1943, he published his first book of poetry. His career as a poet began to take off when his first collection Finding Gold was published in 1967. By 1980 Norris published three volumes in the Phoenix Living Poets. His publication Ransoms had won the Poetry Society's Alice Hunt Bartlett Prize in 1970.

In addition to poems and short stories, Norris published translation, biographies, and reviews. His personal works deal with such themes as his Welsh home, his past, especially the pre-war period, his experiences as a teacher, nature, and the life of the instinct. He is considered a fine technician. In 1989 he published a translation of Sonnets to Orpheus with another professor at BYU.

Publications
Finding Gold (1967)
The Loud Winder (1967)
Phoenix Living Poets series: Ransoms (1970)
Mountains, Polecats, Pheasants (1974)
Sliding (1978)
The Girl from Cardigan (1988)
Norris's Ark (1988)
The Collected Poems (1996)
Collected Stories of Leslie Norris (1996)
Holy Places (1998)
A Tiger in the Zoo (1938)

Awards
His works have won numerous awards, including the Cholmondeley Poetry Prize, the David Higham Memorial Prize, the Katherine Mansfield Memorial Award, the AML Award for poetry (in 1996), and the Welsh Arts Council Senior Fiction Award. He is also an honorary Doctor of Letters of the University of Glamorgan, and honorary Doctor of Humane Letters of BYU. Leslie is a Fellow of the Royal Society of Literature and of the Welsh Academy.

Leslie died on 6 April 2006 Provo, USA

References

Further reading
Daniel Westover and Jesse Crissler (eds.): Literature and Belief, Special Leslie Norris Issue, vols. 29 and 30.1, 2010.
 Eugene England and Peter Makuck (eds.): An Open World: Essays on Leslie Norris, Camden House, Columbia, SC, 1994
 Dictionary of Literary Biography
 Chapter 5 on Leslie Norris, of "Wordsworth's Influence on 20th Century Welsh Poets", unpublished dissertation by James Prothero in the National Library of Wales and University of Wales, Lampeter library.  This includes two letters and two long interviews with Norris which may have been some of the last interviews with him.

External links 
'An astonishing life' — Poet Leslie Norris Article on deseretnews.com. Captured 2 December 2005.

 "Leslie Norris" (Fellows Remembered), The Royal Society of Literature

1921 births
2006 deaths
Welsh short story writers
Welsh male poets
Brigham Young University faculty
Welsh emigrants to the United States
Fellows of the Royal Society of Literature
People from Merthyr Tydfil
Royal Air Force personnel of World War II
20th-century Welsh poets